Arac or ARAC may refer to:

 Araç, a town in Turkey
 Arač, former name of Novi Bečej, a town in Serbia
 Arac (video game), a 1986 video game
 Ara-C, alternative name of Cytarabine, a chemotherapy drug
 AraC, a component of the L-arabinose operon in the genome of the bacterium Escherichia coli
 ARAC, the Army Reserve Aviation Command of the US
 A character in Alfred Lord Tennyson's The Princess (Tennyson poem)
 A character in Gilbert and Sullivan's Princess Ida and  Gilbert's earlier The Princess (play), both based on the Tennyson poem.

People with the name 
 Jonathan Arac, American literary scholar
 Özlem Araç, Turkish footballer

See also 
Arak (disambiguation)